National Street (Czech title: Národní třída) is a 2019 Czech drama film starring Hynek Čermák. It is based on a book by Jaroslav Rudiš of the same name.

Plot
The film is about man known as Vandam. He lives in prefab housing estate in Prague. He trains every night to be fits which earns him nickname reminiscent of Jean-Claude Van Damme. He likes barmaid Lucka who gets into trouble due to debts and Vandam decides to help her.

Cast and characters
 Hynek Čermák as Vandam
 Kateřina Janečková as Lucka
 Jan Cina as Psycho
 Václav Neužil as Milner
 Jiří Langmajer as Roman
 Martin Sobotka as Séf
 Erika Stárková as Hairdresser
 Lubor Šplíchal as Mayor
 Andrej Polák as Spokesperson
 Martin Siničák as Vandam's father
 Bára Vozková as Gábina
 Terezie Vraspírová as Rich Russian girl

Production
Shooting started on 27 August 2018. Production concluded in July 2019. The film was shot in Prague.

References

External links
 

2019 films
Czech drama films
German drama films
2010s Czech-language films
2019 drama films
2010s German films